Bogdan Nicolae (born 26 April 1976, București) is a former Romanian footballer.

Honours
Steaua București
Supercupa României: 2001
FC Braşov
Liga II: 2007–08
Juventus București
Liga III: 2009–10

External links

1976 births
Living people
Romanian footballers
Association football defenders
Liga I players
Liga II players
Israeli Premier League players
AFC Rocar București players
ACF Gloria Bistrița players
FC Astra Giurgiu players
FC Brașov (1936) players
FC Vaslui players
ASC Daco-Getica București players
Bnei Sakhnin F.C. players
Romanian expatriate footballers
Expatriate footballers in Israel
Romanian expatriate sportspeople in Israel